Eliza Lynn Linton (10 February 1822 – 14 July 1898) was the first female salaried journalist in Britain and the author of over 20 novels. Despite her path-breaking role as an independent woman, many of her essays took a strong anti-feminist slant.

Life
Linton was born in Keswick, Cumbria, England, the youngest of the twelve children of the Rev. James Lynn, vicar of Crosthwaite, and his wife Charlotte, who was the daughter of a bishop of Carlisle. The death of her mother when Eliza was five months old meant a chaotic upbringing, in which she was largely self-educated, but in 1845 she left home to earn her living as a writer in London.

After moving to Paris, she married W. J. Linton in 1858, an eminent wood-engraver, who was also a poet of note, a writer on his craft, and a Chartist agitator. She moved into his ramshackle house, Brantwood, in the Lake District, with his seven children from an earlier marriage, and wrote there a novel set locally: Lizzie Lorton of Greyrigg. The couple also lived at Gang Moor on the edge of Hampstead Heath for several years. In 1867 they separated amicably, her husband going to America and Eliza going back to life as a London writer.

Linton returned briefly to her childhood home in Cumbria in 1889, to feel "half in a dream here. It is Keswick and yet not Keswick, as I am Eliza Lynn and yet not Eliza Lynn." She usually lived in London until about three years before her death, when she retired to Brougham House, Malvern. She died at Queen Anne's Mansions, London, on 14 July 1898. Her ashes were scattered in Crosthwaite churchyard.

Career
Linton arrived in London in 1845 as a protégée of the novelist William Harrison Ainsworth and the poet Walter Savage Landor. At one time she was promoted by Theodosia Monson, who was a champion of women's rights. In 1846 she produced her first novel, Azeth, the Egyptian, which was followed by Amymone (1848) and Realities (1851). Neither had great success. Meanwhile she began working as a journalist and became acquainted with George Eliot. Linton joined the staff of the Morning Chronicle in 1849, a position said to have made her the first woman to be paid a salary as a journalist. She left the paper in 1851 over a disagreement.

During her time in Paris, Linton was a correspondent for The Leader, which her husband had helped found. She was a regular contributor to Charles Dickens's Household Words and to St James's Gazette, the Daily News, Ainsworth's Magazine, The Cornhill Magazine and other leading newspapers. The prolific Linton became one of the best-known women periodical contributors of her time. Her 1864 guide to The Lake Country still bears reading for tart comments on the tourist rituals of the Victorians.

In 1881 and 1883 she travelled to Palermo, where she met Tina Whitaker and encouraged her to write.

After separating from her husband, Linton returned to writing novels, in which she finally attained wide popularity. Her most successful works were The True History of Joshua Davidson (1872), Patricia Kemball (1874), and The Autobiography of Christopher Kirkland (1885), the latter being in fact a thinly disguised autobiography. In 1896, she became one of the first women to be elected to the Society of Authors and was the first woman to serve on the society's committee.

Views
Linton was a severe critic of early feminism. Her prominent essay on the subject, "The Girl of the Period," appeared in the Saturday Review in 1868 as a vehement attack. In 1891, she wrote "Wild Women as Politicians", explaining her view that politics were naturally the sphere of men, as was fame of any sort. "Amongst our most renowned women," she wrote, "are some who say with their whole heart, I would rather have been the wife of a great man, or the mother of a hero, than what I am, famous in my own person." Linton exemplifies how the fight against votes for women was not organised only by men (see Anti-suffragism).

Her obituary in The Times noted her "animosity towards all, or rather, some of those facets which may be conveniently called the 'New Woman'," but added that "it would perhaps be difficult to reduce Mrs. Lynn Linton's views on what was and what was not desirable for her own sex to a logical and connected form." Revisionist critics have noted an unconscious sympathy for the dashing "modern women" in her fiction, and to her support for the right of married women to own property and so gain greater independence. (See Married Women's Property Act 1870 and Married Women's Property Act 1882.)

Linton's contribution to a symposium on English fiction in 1890 took a less aggressive stance towards Grundyism than her fellow-contributor Thomas Hardy.

Works
Azeth, The Egyptian, T.C. Newby, 1847
Amymone: A Romance in the Days of Pericles, Vol. 2, Vol. 3, Richard Bentley, 1848
Realities: A Tale, Saunders and Otley, 1851
Witch Stories, Chapman & Hall, 1861
The Lake Country, Smith, Elder and Company, 1864
Grasp Your Nettle, Vol. 2, Vol. 3, Smith, Elder & Co., 1865
Lizzie Lorton of Greyrigg: A Novel, Harper & Brothers, 1866
Sowing the Wind, Vol. 2, Vol. 3, Tinsley Brothers 1867
"Clementina Kinniside," The Galaxy 5, January/July 1868
The True History of Joshua Davidson, Christian and Communist, J. B. Lippincott, 1873 [1st publication, Strahan & Company, 1872]
Patricia Kemball, J. B. Lippincott & Co., 1875
The Mad Willoughbys and other Tales, 1875
The Atonement of Leam Dundas, J. B. Lippincott & Co., 1876
From Dreams to Waking, Harper & Bros, 1877
The World Well Lost, Vol. 2, Chatto & Windus, 1877
Under which Lord?, Vol. 2, Vol. 3, Chatto & Windus, 1879
"At Night in a Hospital," Belgravia, July 1879
The Rebel of the Family, Vol. 2, Chatto & Windus, 1880
With a Silken Thread and other Stories, Chatto & Windus, 1880
My Love!, Chatto & Windus, 1881
Ione, Chatto and Windus, 1883
The Girl of the Period and Other Social Essays, Vol. 2, Richard Bentley & Son, 1883
Ourselves: Essays on Women, Chatto & Windus, 1884
The Autobiography of Christopher Kirkland, Vol. 2, Vol. 3, R. Bentley, 1885
Stabbed in the Dark, F. V. White & Co., 1885
"A Protest and a Plea," The Order of Creation: The Conflict Between Genesis and Geology, The Truth Seeker Company, 1885
Rift in the Lute, Simpkin, 1885
Paston Carew, Millionaire and Miser: A Novel, Bentley, 1886
Through the Long Night, Hurst & Blackett Limited, 1889
About Ireland, Methuen & Co., 1890
An Octave of Friends, with other Silhouettes and Stories, Ward & Downey, 1891
About Ulster, Methuen & Co., 1892
The One too Many, F. Tennyson Neely, 1894
In Haste and at Leisure, Merriam Co., 1895
Dulcie Everton, Vol. 2, Chatto & Windus, 1896
'Twixt Cup & Lip. Etc, Digby, Long & Co., 1896
My Literary Life, Hodder and Stroughton, 1899
The Second Youth of Theodora Desanges, Hutchinson & Co., 1900
The Fate of Madame Cabanel, n.d.
The Witches of Scotland, n.d.

Selected articles
"The Modern Revolt," Macmillan's Magazine, December 1870
An Old English Home, The Atlantic Monthly, 32, July 1873
"Some Sicilian Customs," The Eclectic Magazine 41, New Series, 1885
"A Protest and a Plea," The Gentleman's Magazine 260, 1886
"The Future Supremacy of Women," The National Review, Vol. VIII, 1886
"The Higher Education of Women", Popular Science Monthly 30, December 1886
"Womanhood in Old Greece," The Library Magazine 2, Third Series, November 1886/March 1887
"The Tyranny of Fashion," The Forum 3, March 1887
“The Roman Matron,” The Library Magazine 4, Third Series, July/September 1887
“The Pains of Fear,” The Forum 5, May 1888
“Are Good Women Characterless?,” The Forum 6, February 1889
“Democracy in the Household,” The Forum 8, September 1889
"Our Illusions," Fortnightly Review 49, pp. 596–7, 1891
"The Revolt Against Matrimony," The Forum 10 (5), January 1891
"The Judicial Shock to Marriage," Nineteenth Century 29, May 1891
"The Wild Women: as Politicians," Nineteenth Century, July 1891
"The Wild Women As Social Insurgents," The Nineteenth Century 30, pp. 596–605, October 1891
"The Partisans of the Wild Women," Nineteenth Century 31, pp. 455–464, April 1892
"The New Woman," St. James's Budget, July 1894
"The Rex Nemorum," St. James's Budget, August 1894
"The Philistine's Coming Triumph," National Review 26, September 1895
"Cranks and Crazes," The North American Review, December 1895
"George Eliot." In Women Novelists of Queen Victoria's Reign, Hurst & Blackett, Limited, 1897

See also

Notes

References
Deirdre d'Albertis (1996), "Make-believers in Bayswater and Belgravia: Bronte, Linton, and the Victorian Flirt," Victorians Institute Journal 24
Nancy Fix Anderson (1987), Woman Against Women in Victorian England: A Life of Eliza Lynn Linton. Indiana University Press
Nancy Fix Anderson (1989), "Eliza Lynn Linton, Dickens, and the Woman Question," Victorian Periodicals Review 22, No. 4, 134–141 
Andrea Lynn Broomfield (2001), "Much More Than an Antifeminist:  Eliza Lynn Linton's Contributions to the Rise of Victorian Popular Journalism," Victorian Literature and Culture 29 (2), 267–283
Andrea Lynn Broomfield (2004), "Eliza Lynn Linton, Sarah Grand and the Spectacle of the Victorian Woman Question: Catch Phrases, Buzz Words and Sound Bites," English Literature in Transition, 1880–1920 47 (3), 251–272
Elizabeth Latta Brother (1999), "A Profession of Their Own:  A Study of the Journalistic, Margaret Oliphant, Eliza Lynn Linton, and Emilia Dilke," Dissertation Abstracts International 60 (5)
Judith Flanders (2004), Inside the Victorian Home: a Portrait of Domestic Life in Victorian England. New York: W. W. Norton
Christopher Herbert (1983), "He Knew He Was Right, Mrs. Lynn Linton, and the Duplicities of Victorian Marriage," Texas Studies in Literature and Language 25 (3), 448–469
George Somes Layard (1901), Mrs. Lynn Linton; Her Life, Letters, and Opinions. London: Methuen & Co
Frederick Sessions (1905), "A Successful Novelist: Eliza Lynn Linton," in Literary Celebrities of the English Lake-District. London: Eliot Stock
Herbert Van Thal (1979), Eliza Lynn Linton: The Girl of the Period: A Biography. London/Boston: Allen and Unwin

External links

Linton, Elizabeth [Eliza] Lynn (1822–1898)
Linton, Eliza Lynn (DNB01)
Portraits at the National Portraits Gallery
Eliza Lynn Linton (1822–1898), by John Collier

1822 births
1898 deaths
19th-century English women writers
19th-century British writers
19th-century English writers
Anti-suffragists
English women novelists
Female critics of feminism
Victorian novelists
Victorian women writers
19th-century British journalists